The Rice Brothers is album recorded by guitarist Tony Rice and his brothers Ron, Larry, and Wyatt. .

Track listing 

 "Grapes on the Vine" (Steve Gillette and Charles John Quarto)
 "This Old House" (Craig Bickhardt / Thom Schuyler)
 "Original Untitled" (Wyatt Rice)
 "Teardrops in My Eyes" (Red Allen (bluegrass) / Tommy Sutton)
 "You're Drifting Away" (Bill Monroe)
 "Don't Think Twice" (Bob Dylan)
 "Let It Ride" (Gordon Lightfoot)
 "Keep the Lamp on Sadie" (Larry Rice)
 "Soldier's Joy" (Traditional)
 "Whisper My Name" (Gordon Lightfoot)
 "Life Is Like a Mountain Railway" (M. E. Abbey and Charles Davis Tillman)

Personnel
 Tony Rice – guitar, vocals
 Wyatt Rice - guitar
 Larry Rice - mandolin, vocals
 Ron Rice - bass
 Bill Emerson - banjo, vocals
 Frank Poindexter - Dobro
 Jerry Douglas - Dobro
 Rickie Simpkins - violin, viola
 Jon Carroll - piano, vocals

References

External links 
 

1989 albums
Tony Rice albums
Rounder Records albums